The women's 3 metre springboard was one of four diving events included in the Diving at the 1996 Summer Olympics programme.

The competition was split into three phases:

Preliminary round 30 July — Each diver performed a set number of dives without any limitation on the difficulty degree. The 18 divers with the highest total score advanced to the semi-final.
Semi-final 30 July — Each diver performed a set number of dives without any limitation on the difficulty degree. The 12 divers with the highest combined score from the semi-final and preliminary dives advanced to the final.
Final 31 July — Each diver performed a set number of dives, without limitation on the difficulty degree. The final ranking was determined by the combined score from the final and semifinal dives.

Results

References

Sources
 

Women
1996
1996 in women's diving
Div